Daytrip provides vehicle for hire services for international travelers.

Daytrip connects travelers with local, English-speaking drivers, who provide door-to-door transportation with optional sightseeing stops. They may also provide insight into local culture from their unique point of view. The company currently operates in over 89 countries with plans to expand globally.

History
Daytrip was founded in September 2015 and launched its service in 6 Central European countries: Czech Republic, Germany, Austria, Poland, Slovakia, and Hungary. Later, Daytrip added connections between Slovenia, Croatia and Italy. Currently Daytrip operates in 89 countries across Europe, Africa, the Middle East, the Americas, and Southeast Asia. As of 2022, they have served over 400,000 customers, while maintaining a 5* rating on Tripadvisor, earning a Certificate of Excellence every year from 2016.

In 2022 Daytrip closed a Series A funding of €6.14 million with backing from Euroventures, J&T Ventures, Nation 1 VC, and Pale Fire Capital.

Features
The website offers the travelers the possibility to book a customized itinerary with an English-speaking local driver. They must enter their pickup and drop-off locations, and while booking have the option to add sightseeing stops from a curated list of the best attractions along the way.

In 2021, Daytrip launched their iOS app to make booking and managing trips easier for travelers.

References

External links
Official Website

Ridesharing companies of the United Kingdom